David Keith Lynch (born January 20, 1946) is an American filmmaker, visual artist and actor. A recipient of an Academy Honorary Award in 2019, Lynch has received three Academy Award nominations for Best Director, as well as the Palme d'Or at the Cannes Film Festival and a Golden Lion. In 2007, a panel of critics convened by The Guardian announced that "after all the discussion, no one could fault the conclusion that David Lynch is the most important film-maker of the current era", while AllMovie called him "the Renaissance man of modern American filmmaking". His work led to him being labeled "the first populist surrealist" by film critic Pauline Kael.

Lynch studied painting before he began making short films in the late 1960s. His first feature-length film, the surrealist Eraserhead (1977), followed by The Elephant Man (1980), Dune (1984), Blue Velvet (1986), Wild at Heart (1990), Lost Highway (1997), Mulholland Drive (2001), and Inland Empire (2006). Lynch and Mark Frost created the ABC series Twin Peaks (1990–1991), and Lynch co-wrote and directed its film prequel, Twin Peaks: Fire Walk with Me (1992), and the limited series Twin Peaks: The Return (2017). He also portrayed Gordon Cole in the Twin Peaks projects.

Lynch's other artistic endeavors include his work as a musician, encompassing the studio albums BlueBOB (2001), Crazy Clown Time (2011), and The Big Dream (2013), as well as music and sound design for a variety of his films (sometimes alongside collaborators Alan Splet, Dean Hurley, and/or Angelo Badalamenti); painting and photography; writing the books Images (1994), Catching the Big Fish (2006), Room to Dream (2018), and numerous other literary works; and directing several music videos as well as advertisements.

A practitioner of Transcendental Meditation (TM), in 2005 he founded the David Lynch Foundation, which seeks to fund the teaching of TM in schools and has since widened its scope to other at-risk populations, including the homeless, veterans, and refugees.

Early life

David Keith Lynch was born in Missoula, Montana on January 20, 1946. His father, Donald Walton Lynch (1915–2007), was a research scientist working for the U.S. Department of Agriculture (USDA), and his mother, Edwina "Sunny" Lynch (née Sundberg; 1919–2004), was an English language tutor. Two of Lynch's maternal great-grandparents were Finnish-Swedish immigrants who arrived in the U.S. during the 19th century. He was raised as a Presbyterian. The Lynches often moved around according to where the USDA assigned Donald. Because of this, Lynch moved with his parents to Sandpoint, Idaho when he was two months old; two years later, after his brother John was born, the family moved to Spokane, Washington. Lynch's sister Martha was born there. The family then moved to Durham, North Carolina, Boise, Idaho, and Alexandria, Virginia. Lynch adjusted to this transitory early life with relative ease, noting that he usually had no issue making new friends whenever he started attending a new school. Of his early life, he remarked:

Alongside his schooling, Lynch joined the Boy Scouts, although he later said he only "became [a Scout] so I could quit and put it behind me". He rose to the highest rank of Eagle Scout. As an Eagle Scout, he was present with other Boy Scouts outside the White House at the inauguration of President John F. Kennedy, which took place on Lynch's 15th birthday. Lynch was also interested in painting and drawing from an early age, and became intrigued by the idea of pursuing it as a career path when living in Virginia, where his friend's father was a professional painter.

At Francis C. Hammond High School in Alexandria, Lynch did not excel academically, having little interest in schoolwork, but he was popular with other students, and after leaving he decided that he wanted to study painting at college. He began his studies at the Corcoran School of the Arts and Design in Washington, D.C., before transferring in 1964 to the School of the Museum of Fine Arts, Boston, where he was roommates with musician Peter Wolf. He left after only a year, saying, "I was not inspired AT ALL in that place." He instead decided that he wanted to travel around Europe for three years with his friend Jack Fisk, who was similarly unhappy with his studies at Cooper Union. They had some hopes that they could train in Europe with Austrian expressionist painter Oskar Kokoschka at his school. Upon reaching Salzburg, however, they found that Kokoschka was not available; disillusioned, they returned to the United States after spending only two weeks in Europe.

Career
1960s: Philadelphia and short films
Back in the United States, Lynch returned to Virginia, but since his parents had moved to Walnut Creek, California, he stayed with his friend Toby Keeler for a while. He decided to move to Philadelphia and enroll at the Pennsylvania Academy of Fine Arts, after advice from Fisk, who was already enrolled there. He preferred this college to his previous school in Boston, saying, "In Philadelphia there were great and serious painters, and everybody was inspiring one another and it was a beautiful time there." It was here that he began a relationship with a fellow student, Peggy Reavey, whom he married in 1967. The following year, Peggy gave birth to their daughter Jennifer. Peggy later said, "[Lynch] definitely was a reluctant father, but a very loving one. Hey, I was pregnant when we got married. We were both reluctant." As a family, they moved to Philadelphia's Fairmount neighborhood, where they bought a 12-room house for the relatively low price of $3,500 due to the area's high crime and poverty rates. Lynch later said:

Meanwhile, to help support his family, he took a job printing engravings. At the Pennsylvania Academy, Lynch made his first short film, Six Men Getting Sick (Six Times) (1967). He had first come up with the idea when he developed a wish to see his paintings move, and he began discussing doing animation with an artist named Bruce Samuelson. When this project never came about, Lynch decided to work on a film alone, and purchased the cheapest 16mm camera that he could find. Taking one of the academy's abandoned upper rooms as a workspace, he spent $150, which at the time he felt to be a lot of money, to produce Six Men Getting Sick. Calling the film "57 seconds of growth and fire, and three seconds of vomit", Lynch played it on a loop at the academy's annual end-of-year exhibit, where it shared joint first prize with a painting by Noel Mahaffey. This led to a commission from one of his fellow students, the wealthy H. Barton Wasserman, who offered him $1,000 to create a film installation in his home. Spending $478 of that on the second-hand Bolex camera "of [his] dreams", Lynch produced a new animated short, but upon getting the film developed, realized that the result was a blurred, frameless print. He later said, "So I called up [Wasserman] and said, 'Bart, the film is a disaster. The camera was broken and what I've done hasn't turned out.' And he said, 'Don't worry, David, take the rest of the money and make something else for me. Just give me a print.' End of story."

With his leftover money, Lynch decided to experiment with a mix of animation and live action, producing the four-minute short The Alphabet (1968). The film starred Lynch's wife Peggy as a character known as The Girl, who chants the alphabet to a series of images of horses before dying at the end by hemorrhaging blood all over her bed sheets. Adding a sound effect, Lynch used a broken Uher tape recorder to record the sound of Jennifer crying, creating a distorted sound that Lynch found particularly effective. Later describing what had inspired him, Lynch said, "Peggy's niece was having a bad dream one night and was saying the alphabet in her sleep in a tormented way. So that's sort of what started The Alphabet going. The rest of it was just subconscious."

Learning about the newly founded American Film Institute, which gave grants to filmmakers who could support their application with a prior work and a script for a new project, Lynch decided to send them a copy of The Alphabet along with a script he had written for a new short film that would be almost entirely live action, The Grandmother. The institute agreed to help finance the work, initially offering him $5,000 out of his requested budget of $7,200, but later granting him the additional $2,200. Starring people he knew from both work and college and filmed in his own house, The Grandmother featured a neglected boy who "grows" a grandmother from a seed to care for him. The film critics Michelle Le Blanc and Colin Odell wrote, "this film is a true oddity but contains many of the themes and ideas that would filter into his later work, and shows a remarkable grasp of the medium".

1970s: Los Angeles and Eraserhead

In 1971, Lynch moved with his wife and daughter to Los Angeles, where he began studying filmmaking at the AFI Conservatory, a place he later called "completely chaotic and disorganized, which was great ... you quickly learned that if you were going to get something done, you would have to do it yourself. They wanted to let people do their thing." He began writing a script for a proposed work, Gardenback, that had "unfolded from this painting I'd done". In this venture he was supported by a number of figures at the Conservatory, who encouraged him to lengthen the script and add more dialogue, which he reluctantly agreed to do. All the interference on his Gardenback project made him fed up with the Conservatory and led him to quit after returning to start his second year and being put in first-year classes. AFI dean Frank Daniel asked Lynch to reconsider, believing that he was one of the school's best students. Lynch agreed on the condition that he could create a project that would not be interfered with. Feeling that Gardenback was "wrecked", he set out on a new film, Eraserhead.Eraserhead was planned to be about 42 minutes long (it ended up being 89 minutes), its script was only 21 pages, and Lynch was able to create the film without interference. Filming began on May 29, 1972, at night in some abandoned stables, allowing the production team, which was largely Lynch and some of his friends, including Sissy Spacek, Jack Fisk, cinematographer Frederick Elmes and sound designer Alan Splet, to set up a camera room, green room, editing room, sets as well as a food room and a bathroom. The AFI gave Lynch a $10,000 grant, but it was not enough to complete the film, and under pressure from studios after the success of the relatively cheap feature film Easy Rider, it was unable to give him more. Lynch was then supported by a loan from his father and money that he earned from a paper route that he took up, delivering The Wall Street Journal. Not long into Eraserhead's production, Lynch and Peggy amicably separated and divorced, and he began living full-time on set. In 1977, Lynch married Mary Fisk, sister of Jack Fisk.

Lynch has said that not a single reviewer of the film understood it in the way he intended. Filmed in black and white, Eraserhead tells the story of Henry (Jack Nance), a quiet young man living in a dystopian industrial wasteland, whose girlfriend gives birth to a deformed baby whom she leaves in his care. It was heavily influenced by the fearful mood of Philadelphia, and Lynch has called it "my Philadelphia Story".

Due to financial problems the filming of Eraserhead was haphazard, regularly stopping and starting again. It was in one such break in 1974 that Lynch created the short film The Amputee, a one-shot film about two minutes long. Lynch proposed that he make The Amputee to present to AFI to test two different types of film stock.Eraserhead was finally finished in 1976. Lynch tried to get it entered into the Cannes Film Festival, but while some reviewers liked it, others felt it was awful, and it was not selected for screening. Reviewers from the New York Film Festival also rejected it, but it was screened at the Los Angeles Film Festival, where Ben Barenholtz, the distributor of the Elgin Theater, heard about it. He was very supportive of the movie, helping to distribute it around the United States in 1977, and Eraserhead subsequently became popular on the midnight movie underground circuit, and was later called one of the most important midnight movies of the 1970s, along with El Topo, Pink Flamingos, The Rocky Horror Picture Show, The Harder They Come and Night of the Living Dead. Stanley Kubrick said it was one of his all-time favorite films.

1980s: The Elephant Man, Dune and Blue Velvet
After Eraserhead's success on the underground circuit, Stuart Cornfeld, an executive producer for Mel Brooks, saw it and later said, "I was just 100 percent blown away ... I thought it was the greatest thing I'd ever seen. It was such a cleansing experience." He agreed to help Lynch with his next film, Ronnie Rocket, for which Lynch had already written a script. But Lynch soon realized that Ronnie Rocket, a film that he has said is about "electricity and a three-foot guy with red hair", was not going to be picked up by any financiers, and so he asked Cornfeld to find him a script by someone else that he could direct. Cornfeld found four. On hearing the title of the first, The Elephant Man, Lynch chose it.The Elephant Man's script, written by Chris de Vore and Eric Bergren, was based on a true story, that of Joseph Merrick, a severely deformed man in Victorian London, who was held in a sideshow but later taken under the care of a London surgeon, Frederick Treves. Lynch wanted to make some alterations that would alter the story from true events but in his view make a better plot, but he needed Mel Brooks's permission, as Brooks's company, Brooksfilms, was responsible for production. Brooks viewed Eraserhead, and after coming out of the screening theatre, embraced Lynch, declaring, "You're a madman! I love you! You're in."The Elephant Man starred John Hurt as John Merrick (the name changed from Joseph) and Anthony Hopkins as Treves. Filming took place in London. Though surrealistic and in black and white, it has been called "one of the most conventional" of Lynch's films. The Elephant Man was a huge critical and commercial success, earning eight Academy Award nominations, including Best Director and Best Adapted Screenplay.

After The Elephant Man's success, George Lucas, a fan of Eraserhead, offered Lynch the opportunity to direct the third film in his Star Wars trilogy, Return of the Jedi. Lynch declined, saying that he had "next door to zero interest" and arguing that Lucas should direct the film himself as the movie should reflect his own vision, not Lynch's. Soon, the opportunity to direct another big-budget science fiction epic arose when Dino de Laurentiis of the De Laurentiis Entertainment Group asked Lynch to create a film adaptation of Frank Herbert's science fiction novel Dune (1965). Lynch agreed, and in doing so was also contractually obliged to produce two other works for the company. He set about writing a script based upon the novel, initially with both Chris de Vore and Eric Bergren, and then alone when De Laurentiis was unhappy with their ideas. Lynch also helped build some of the sets, attempting to create "a certain look", and particularly enjoyed building the set for the oil planet Giedi Prime, for which he used "steel, bolts, and porcelain".Dune is set in the far future, when humans live in an interstellar empire under a feudal system. The main character, Paul Atreides (Kyle MacLachlan), is the son of a noble who takes control of the desert planet Arrakis, which grows the rare spice melange, the empire's most highly prized commodity. Lynch was unhappy with the work, later saying, "Dune was a kind of studio film. I didn't have final cut. And, little by little, I was subconsciously making compromises" [to his own vision]. Much of his footage was eventually removed from the final theatrical cut, dramatically condensing the plot. Although De Laurentiis hoped it would be as successful as Star Wars, Dune (1984) was a critical and commercial dud; it had cost $45 million to make, and grossed $27.4 million domestically. Later, Universal Studios released an "extended cut" for syndicated television, containing almost an hour of cutting-room-floor footage and new narration. It did not represent Lynch's intentions, but the studio considered it more comprehensible than the original version. Lynch objected to the changes and had his name struck from the extended cut, which has Alan Smithee credited as the director and "Judas Booth" (a pseudonym Lynch invented, reflecting his feelings of betrayal) as the screenwriter.

Meanwhile, in 1983, he had begun the writing and drawing of a comic strip, The Angriest Dog in the World, which featured unchanging graphics of a tethered dog that was so angry that it could not move, alongside cryptic philosophical references. It ran from 1983 to 1992 in the Village Voice, Creative Loafing and other tabloid and alternative publications. Around this time Lynch also became interested in photography as an art form, and traveled to northern England to photograph the degrading industrial landscape.

Lynch was contractually still obliged to produce two other projects for De Laurentiis, the first a planned sequel to Dune, which due to the film's failure never went beyond the script stage. The other was a more personal work, based on a script Lynch had been working on for some time. Developing from ideas that Lynch had had since 1973, the film, Blue Velvet, was set in the real town of Lumberton, North Carolina, and revolves around a college student, Jeffrey Beaumont (MacLachlan), who finds a severed ear in a field. Investigating further with the help of friend Sandy (Laura Dern), he discovers that it is related to a criminal gang led by psychopath Frank Booth (Dennis Hopper), who has kidnapped the husband and child of singer Dorothy Vallens (Isabella Rossellini) and repeatedly rapes her. Lynch has called the story "a dream of strange desires wrapped inside a mystery story".

Lynch included pop songs from the 1960s in the film, including Roy Orbison's "In Dreams" and Bobby Vinton's "Blue Velvet", the latter of which largely inspired the film. Lynch has said, "It was the song that sparked the movie ... There was something mysterious about it. It made me think about things. And the first things I thought about were lawns—lawns and the neighborhood. Other music for the film was composed by Angelo Badalamenti, who wrote the music for most of Lynch's subsequent work. De Laurentiis loved the film, and it received support at some of the early specialist screenings, but the preview screenings to mainstream audiences were very negatively received, with most of the viewers hating the film. Lynch had found success with The Elephant Man, but Blue Velvets controversy with audiences and critics introduced him into the mainstream, and it became a huge critical and moderate commercial success. The film earned Lynch his second Academy Award nomination for Best Director. Woody Allen, whose Hannah and Her Sisters was nominated for Best Picture, said Blue Velvet was his favorite film of the year. In the late 1980s, Lynch began to work in television, directing a short piece, The Cowboy and the Frenchman, for French television in 1989.

 1990s: Twin Peaks, Wild at Heart and other works 

Around this time, he met the television producer Mark Frost, who had worked on such projects as Hill Street Blues, and they decided to start working together on a biopic of Marilyn Monroe based on Anthony Summers's book The Goddess: The Secret Lives of Marilyn Monroe, but it never got off the ground. They went on to work on a comedy script, One Saliva Bubble, but that did not see completion either. While talking in a coffee shop, Lynch and Frost had the idea of a corpse washing up on a lakeshore, and went to work on their third project, initially called Northwest Passage but eventually Twin Peaks (1990–91). A drama series set in a small Washington town where popular high school student Laura Palmer has been murdered, Twin Peaks featured FBI Special Agent Dale Cooper (MacLachlan) as the investigator trying to identify the killer, and discovering not only the murder's supernatural aspects but also many of the townsfolk's secrets; Lynch said, "The project was to mix a police investigation with the ordinary lives of the characters." He later said, "[Mark Frost and I] worked together, especially in the initial stages. Later on we started working more apart." They pitched the series to ABC, which agreed to finance the pilot and eventually commissioned a season comprising seven episodes.

During season one Lynch directed two of the seven episodes, devoting more time to his film Wild at Heart, but carefully chose the other episodes' directors. He also appeared in several episodes as FBI agent Gordon Cole. The series was a success, with high ratings in the United States and many other countries, and soon spawned a cult following. Soon a second season of 22 episodes went into production, but ABC executives believed that public interest in the show was decreasing. The network insisted that Lynch and Frost reveal Laura Palmer's killer's identity prematurely, which Lynch grudgingly agreed to do, in what Lynch has called one of his biggest professional regrets. After identifying the murderer and moving from Thursday to Saturday night, Twin Peaks continued for several more episodes, but was canceled after a ratings drop. Lynch, who disliked the direction that writers and directors took in the later episodes, directed the final episode. He ended it with a cliffhanger (like season one had), later saying, "that's not the ending. That's the ending that people were stuck with."

Also while Twin Peaks was in production, the Brooklyn Academy of Music asked Lynch and Badalamenti, who wrote the music for Twin Peaks, to create a theatrical piece to be performed twice in 1989 as a part of the New Music America Festival. The result was Industrial Symphony No. 1: The Dream of the Broken Hearted, which starred frequent Lynch collaborators such as Laura Dern, Nicolas Cage and Michael J. Anderson, and contained five songs sung by Julee Cruise. Lynch produced a 50-minute video of the performance in 1990. Meanwhile, he was also involved in creating various commercials for companies including Yves Saint Laurent, Calvin Klein, Giorgio Armani and the Japanese coffee company Namoi, which featured a Japanese man searching Twin Peaks for his missing wife.

While Lynch was working on the first few episodes of Twin Peaks, his friend Monty Montgomery "gave me a book that he wanted to direct as a movie. He asked if I would maybe be executive producer or something, and I said 'That's great, Monty, but what if I read it and fall in love with it and want to do it myself?' And he said, 'In that case, you can do it yourself'." The book was Barry Gifford's novel Wild at Heart: The Story of Sailor and Lula, about two lovers on a road trip. Lynch felt that it was "just exactly the right thing at the right time. The book and the violence in America merged in my mind and many different things happened." With Gifford's support, Lynch adapted the novel into Wild at Heart, a crime and road movie starring Nicolas Cage as Sailor and Laura Dern as Lula. Describing its plot as a "strange blend" of "a road picture, a love story, a psychological drama and a violent comedy", Lynch altered much of the original novel, changing the ending and incorporating numerous references to The Wizard of Oz. Despite a muted response from American critics and viewers, Wild at Heart won the Palme d'Or at the 1990 Cannes Film Festival.

After Wild at Heart's success, Lynch returned to the world of the canceled Twin Peaks, this time without Frost, to create a film that was primarily a prequel but also in part a sequel. Lynch said, "I liked the idea of the story going back and forth in time." The result, Twin Peaks: Fire Walk with Me (1992), primarily revolved around the last few days in the life of Laura Palmer, and was much "darker" in tone than the TV series, with much of the humor removed, and dealing with such topics as incest and murder. Lynch has said the film is about "the loneliness, shame, guilt, confusion and devastation of the victim of incest". The company CIBY-2000 financed Twin Peaks: Fire Walk with Me, and most of the TV series' cast reprised their roles, though some refused and many were unenthusiastic about the project. The film was a commercial failure in the United States at the time of its release, but it has since experienced a critical reappraisal. A number of critics, such as Mark Kermode, have called it Lynch's "masterpiece".

Meanwhile, Lynch worked on some new television shows. He and Frost created the comedy series On the Air (1992), which was canceled after three episodes aired, and he and Monty Montgomery created the three-episode HBO miniseries Hotel Room (1993) about events that happen in one hotel room on different dates.

In 1993, Lynch collaborated with Japanese musician Yoshiki on the video for X Japan's song "Longing ~Setsubou no Yoru~". The video was never officially released, but Lynch claimed in his 2018 memoir Room to Dream that "some of the frames are so fuckin' beautiful, you can't believe it."

After his unsuccessful TV ventures, Lynch returned to film. In 1997, he released the non-linear noiresque Lost Highway, which was co-written by Barry Gifford and starred Bill Pullman and Patricia Arquette. The film failed commercially and received a mixed response from critics.

Lynch then began work on a film from a script by Mary Sweeney and John E. Roach, The Straight Story, based on a true story: that of Alvin Straight (Richard Farnsworth), an elderly man from Laurens, Iowa, who goes on a 300-mile journey to visit his sick brother (Harry Dean Stanton) in Mount Zion, Wisconsin, by riding lawnmower. Asked why he chose this script, Lynch said, "that's what I fell in love with next", and expressed his admiration of Straight, describing him as "like James Dean, except he's old". Badalamenti wrote the music for the film, saying it was "very different from the kind of score he's done for [Lynch] in the past".

Among the many differences from Lynch's other films, The Straight Story contains no profanity, sexuality or violence, and is rated G (general viewing) by the Motion Picture Association of America, which came as "shocking news" to many in the film industry, who were surprised that it "did not disturb, offend or mystify". Le Blanc and Odell write that the plot made it "seem as far removed from Lynch's earlier works as could be imagined, but in fact right from the very opening, this is entirely his film—a surreal road movie".

2000s: Mulholland Drive and other works

The same year, Lynch approached ABC again with ideas for a television drama. The network gave Lynch the go-ahead to shoot a two-hour pilot for the series Mulholland Drive, but disputes over content and running time led to the project being shelved indefinitely. But with $7 million from the French production company StudioCanal, Lynch completed the pilot as a film, Mulholland Drive. The film, a non-linear narrative surrealist tale of Hollywood's dark side, stars Naomi Watts, Laura Harring and Justin Theroux. It performed relatively well at the box office worldwide and was a critical success, earning Lynch Best Director at the 2001 Cannes Film Festival (shared with Joel Coen for The Man Who Wasn't There) and Best Director from the New York Film Critics Association. He also received his third Academy Award nomination for Best Director. In 2016, the film was named the best film of the 21st century in a BBC poll of 177 film critics from 36 countries.

With the rising popularity of the Internet, Lynch decided to use it as a distribution channel, releasing several new series he had created exclusively on his website, davidlynch.com, which went online on December 10, 2001. In 2002, he created a series of online shorts, DumbLand. Intentionally crude in content and execution, the eight-episode series was later released on DVD. The same year, Lynch released a surreal sitcom, Rabbits, about a family of humanoid rabbits. Later, he made his experiments with Digital Video available in the form of the Japanese-style horror short Darkened Room. In 2006, Lynch's feature film Inland Empire was released. At three hours, it is the longest of his films. Like Mulholland Drive and Lost Highway, it does not follow a traditional narrative structure. It stars Lynch regulars Laura Dern, Harry Dean Stanton and Justin Theroux, with cameos by Naomi Watts and Laura Harring as the voices of Suzie and Jane Rabbit, and a performance by Jeremy Irons. Lynch has called Inland Empire "a mystery about a woman in trouble". In an effort to promote it, he made appearances with a cow and a placard bearing the slogan "Without cheese there would be no Inland Empire".

In 2009, Lynch produced a documentary web series directed by his son Austin Lynch and friend Jason S., Interview Project. Interested in working with Werner Herzog, in 2009 Lynch collaborated on Herzog's film My Son, My Son, What Have Ye Done?. With a nonstandard narrative, the film is based on a true story of an actor who committed matricide while acting in a production of the Oresteia, and starred Lynch regular Grace Zabriskie. In 2009, Lynch had plans to direct a documentary on Maharishi Mahesh Yogi consisting of interviews with people who knew him, but nothing has come of it.

 2010s: Continued work, Twin Peaks revival 
In 2010, Lynch began making guest appearances on the Family Guy spin-off The Cleveland Show as Gus the Bartender. He had been convinced to appear in the show by its lead actor, Mike Henry, a fan of Lynch who felt that his whole life had changed after seeing Wild at Heart. Lady Blue Shanghai is a 16-minute promotional film that was written, directed and edited by Lynch for Dior. It was released on the Internet in May 2010.

Lynch directed a concert by English new wave band Duran Duran on March 23, 2011. The concert was streamed live on YouTube from the Mayan Theater in Los Angeles as the kickoff to the second season of Unstaged: An Original Series from American Express. "The idea is to try and create on the fly, layers of images permeating Duran Duran on the stage", Lynch said. "A world of experimentation and hopefully some happy accidents". The animated short I Touch a Red Button Man, a collaboration between Lynch and the band Interpol, played in the background during Interpol's concert at the Coachella Valley Music and Arts Festival in April 2011. The short, which features Interpol's song "Lights", was later made available online.

It was believed that Lynch was going to retire from the film industry; according to Abel Ferrara, Lynch "doesn't even want to make films any more. I've talked to him about it, OK? I can tell when he talks about it." But in a June 2012 Los Angeles Times interview, Lynch said he lacked the inspiration to start a new movie project, but "If I got an idea that I fell in love with, I'd go to work tomorrow". In September 2012, he appeared in the three-part "Late Show" arc on FX's Louie as Jack Dahl. In November 2012, Lynch hinted at plans for a new film while attending Plus Camerimage in Bydgoszcz, Poland, saying, "something is coming up. It will happen but I don't know exactly when". At Plus Camerimage, Lynch received a lifetime achievement award and the Key to the City from Bydgoszcz's mayor, Rafał Bruski. In a January 2013 interview with the Los Angeles Times, Laura Dern confirmed that she and Lynch were planning a new project, and The New York Times later revealed that Lynch was working on the script. Idem Paris, a short documentary film about the lithographic process, was released online in February 2013. On June 28, 2013, a video Lynch directed for the Nine Inch Nails song "Came Back Haunted" was released. He also did photography for the Dumb Numbers' self-titled album released in August 2013.

On October 6, 2014, Lynch confirmed via Twitter that he and Frost would start shooting a new, nine-episode season of Twin Peaks in 2015, with the episodes expected to air in 2016 on Showtime. Lynch and Frost wrote all the episodes. On April 5, 2015, Lynch announced via Twitter that the project was still alive, but he was no longer going to direct because the budget was too low for what he wanted to do. On May 15, 2015, he said via Twitter that he would return to the revival, having sorted out his issues with Showtime. Showtime CEO David Nevins confirmed this, announcing that Lynch would direct every episode of the revival and that the original nine episodes had been extended to 18. Filming was completed by April 2016. The two-episode premiere aired on May 21, 2017.

While doing press for Twin Peaks, Lynch was again asked if he had retired from film and seemed to confirm that he had made his last feature film, responding, "Things changed a lot... So many films were not doing well at the box office even though they might have been great films and the things that were doing well at the box office weren't the things that I would want to do". Lynch later said that this statement had been misconstrued: "I did not say I quit cinema, simply that nobody knows what the future holds."

Since the last episode of The Return aired, there has been speculation about a fourth season. Lynch did not deny the possibility of another season, but said that if it were to happen, it would not air before 2021.

2020s: Weather reports and short films
Lynch did weather reports on his now-defunct website in the 2000s. He has returned to doing weather reports from his apartment in Los Angeles, along with two new series, What is David Lynch Working on Today?, which details him making collages and Today's Number Is..., where each day he picks a random number from 1 to 10 using a jar containing ten numbered ping-pong balls. In one of his weather reports, he detailed a dream he had about being a German soldier shot by an American soldier on D-Day. In June 2020, Lynch rereleased his 2002 web series Rabbits on YouTube. On July 17, 2020, his store for merchandise released a set of face masks with Lynch's art on them for the COVID-19 pandemic. In February 2022, it was announced that Lynch had been cast in the Steven Spielberg film The Fabelmans in a role Variety called at the time "a closely guarded secret", later revealed to be that of real-life film director John Ford, whose famous encounter with Spielberg is dramatized in the film's final moments. Lynch and the cast were nominated for the Screen Actors Guild Award for Outstanding Performance by a Cast in a Motion Picture.

In 2021 it was announced that Lynch was working on a new project for Netflix under the working titles Wisteria and Unrecorded Night. He was set to write and direct 13 episodes with an $85 million budget. Production was set to begin in May 2021 in Los Angeles.

In April 2022, Variety reported that Lynch had a film set to premiere at the 2022 Cannes Film Festival, possibly featuring Laura Dern and Naomi Watts. It was unclear whether this was related to the Wisteria project Lynch was linked to in 2021. Lynch denied the reports in an interview with Entertainment Weekly the next day, saying, "I have no new film coming out. That's a total rumor. So there you are. It is not happening. I don't have a project. I have nothing at Cannes."

Cinematic influences and themes
Influences

Lynch has said his work is more similar to that of European filmmakers than American ones, and that most films that "get down and thrill your soul" are by European directors. He has expressed his admiration for Federico Fellini, Jean-Luc Godard, Ingmar Bergman, Werner Herzog, Alfred Hitchcock, Roman Polanski, Jacques Tati, Stanley Kubrick, and Billy Wilder. He has said that Wilder's Sunset Boulevard (1950) is one of his favorite pictures, as are Kubrick's Lolita (1962), Tati's Monsieur Hulot's Holiday (1953), Hitchcock's Rear Window (1954), and Herzog's Stroszek (1977). He has also cited Herk Harvey's Carnival of Souls (1962) and Jerzy Skolimowski's Deep End (1970) as influences on his work.

Motifs
Several themes recur in Lynch's work. Le Blanc and Odell write, "his films are so packed with motifs, recurrent characters, images, compositions and techniques that you could view his entire output as one large jigsaw puzzle of ideas". One of the key themes they note is the usage of dreams and dreamlike imagery and structure, something they relate to the "surrealist ethos" of relying "on the subconscious to provide visual drive". This can be seen in Merrick's dream of his mother in The Elephant Man, Cooper's dreams of the red room in Twin Peaks and the "dreamlike logic" of the narratives of Eraserhead, Mulholland Drive and Inland Empire. Of his attitude to dreams, Lynch has said, "Waking dreams are the ones that are important, the ones that come when I'm quietly sitting in a chair, letting my mind wander. When you sleep, you don't control your dream. I like to dive into a dream world that I've made or discovered; a world I choose ... [You can't really get others to experience it, but] right there is the power of cinema." His films are known for their use of magic realism. The motif of dreams is closely linked to his recurring use of drones, real-world sounds and musical styles.

Another of Lynch's prominent themes is industry, with repeated imagery of "the clunk of machinery, the power of pistons, shadows of oil drills pumping, screaming woodmills and smoke billowing factories", as seen in the industrial wasteland in Eraserhead, the factories in The Elephant Man, the sawmill in Twin Peaks and the lawnmower in The Straight Story. Of his interest in such things, Lynch has said, "It makes me feel good to see giant machinery, you know, working: dealing with molten metal. And I like fire and smoke. And the sounds are so powerful. It's just big stuff. It means that things are being made, and I really like that."

Another theme is the dark underbelly of violent criminal activity in a society, such as Frank Booth's gang in Blue Velvet and the cocaine smugglers in Twin Peaks. The idea of deformity is also found in several of Lynch's films, from The Elephant Man to the deformed baby in Eraserhead, as well as death from head wounds, found in most of Lynch's films. Other imagery common in Lynch's works includes flickering electricity or lights, fire, and stages upon which a singer performs, often surrounded by drapery.

Except The Elephant Man and Dune, which are set in Victorian London and a fictitious galaxy respectively, all of Lynch's films are set in the United States, and he has said, "I like certain things about America and it gives me ideas. When I go around and I see things, it sparks little stories, or little characters pop out, so it just feels right to me to, you know, make American films." A number of his works, including Blue Velvet, Twin Peaks and Lost Highway, are intentionally reminiscent of 1950s American culture despite being set in later decades of the 20th century. Lynch has said, "It was a fantastic decade in a lot of ways ... there was something in the air that is not there any more at all. It was such a great feeling, and not just because I was a kid. It was a really hopeful time, and things were going up instead of going down. You got the feeling you could do anything. The future was bright. Little did we know we were laying the groundwork for a disastrous future.

Lynch also tends to feature his leading female actors in "split" roles, so that many of his female characters have multiple, fractured identities. This practice began with his casting Sheryl Lee as both Laura Palmer and her cousin Maddy Ferguson in Twin Peaks and continued in his later works. In Lost Highway, Patricia Arquette plays the dual role of Renee Madison/Alice Wakefield; in Mulholland Drive Naomi Watts plays Diane Selwyn/Betty Elms and Laura Harring plays Camilla Rhodes/Rita; in Inland Empire Laura Dern plays Nikki Grace/Susan Blue. The numerous alternative versions of lead characters and fragmented timelines may echo and/or reference the many worlds interpretation of quantum physics and perhaps Lynch's broader interest in quantum mechanics. Some have suggested that Lynch's love for Hitchcock's Vertigo, which employs a split lead character (the Judy Barton and Madeleine Elster characters, both portrayed by Kim Novak) may have influenced this aspect of his work.

His films frequently feature characters with supernatural or omnipotent qualities. They can be seen as physical manifestations of various concepts, such as hatred or fear. Examples include The Man Inside the Planet in Eraserhead, BOB in Twin Peaks, The Mystery Man in Lost Highway, The Bum in Mulholland Drive, and The Phantom in Inland Empire. Lynch approaches his characters and plots in a way that steeps them in a dream state rather than reality.

Recurring collaborators

Lynch is also widely noted for his collaborations with various production artists and composers on his films and other productions. He frequently works with Angelo Badalamenti to compose music for his productions, former wife Mary Sweeney as a film editor, casting director Johanna Ray, and cast members Harry Dean Stanton, Jack Nance, Kyle MacLachlan, Naomi Watts, Isabella Rossellini, Grace Zabriskie, and Laura Dern.

Filmography

Feature films

TV series

Other work
Painting

Lynch first trained as a painter, and although he is now better known as a filmmaker, he has continued to paint. Lynch has stated that "all my paintings are organic, violent comedies. They have to be violently done and primitive and crude, and to achieve that I try to let nature paint more than I paint." Many of his works are very dark in color, and Lynch has said this is because

Many of his works also contain letters and words added to the painting. He explains:

Lynch considers the 20th-century Irish-born British artist Francis Bacon to be his "number one kinda hero painter", stating that "Normally I only like a couple of years of a painter's work, but I like everything of Bacon's. The guy, you know, had the stuff."

Lynch was the subject of a major art retrospective at the Fondation Cartier, Paris from March 3 – May 27, 2007. The show was titled The Air is on Fire and included numerous paintings, photographs, drawings, alternative films and sound work. New site-specific art installations were created specially for the exhibition. A series of events accompanied the exhibition including live performances and concerts.

His alma mater, the Pennsylvania Academy of the Fine Arts, presented an exhibition of his work, entitled "The Unified Field", which opened on September 12, 2014, and ended in January 2015.

Lynch is represented by Kayne Griffin Corcoran in Los Angeles, and has been exhibiting his paintings, drawings, and photography with the gallery since 2011.

His favorite photographers include William Eggleston (The Red Ceiling), Joel-Peter Witkin, and Diane Arbus.

Music

Lynch has also been involved in a number of music projects, many of them related to his films. His album genres switch mainly between experimental rock, ambient soundscapes and, most recently, avant-garde electropop music. Most notably he produced and wrote lyrics for Julee Cruise's first two albums, Floating into the Night (1989) and The Voice of Love (1993), in collaboration with Angelo Badalamenti who composed the music and also produced. Lynch also worked on the 1998 Jocelyn Montgomery album Lux Vivens (Living Light), The Music of Hildegard von Bingen. For his own productions, he composed music for Wild at Heart, Twin Peaks: Fire Walk with Me, Mulholland Drive, and Rabbits. In 2001, he released BlueBob, a rock album performed by Lynch and John Neff. The album is notable for Lynch's unusual guitar playing style. He plays "upside down and backwards, like a lap guitar", and relies heavily on effects pedals. Most recently Lynch composed several pieces for Inland Empire, including two songs, "Ghost of Love" and "Walkin' on the Sky", in which he makes his public debut as a singer. In 2009, his new book-CD set Dark Night of the Soul was released. In 2008, he started his own record label called David Lynch MC which first released Fox Bat Strategy: A Tribute to Dave Jaurequi in early 2009.

In November 2010, Lynch released two electropop music singles, "Good Day Today" and "I Know", through the independent British label Sunday Best Recordings. Describing why he created them, he stated that "I was just sitting and these notes came and then I went down and started working with Dean [Hurley, his engineer] and then these few notes, 'I want to have a good day, today' came and the song was built around that". The singles were followed by an album, Crazy Clown Time, which was released in November 2011 and described as an "electronic blues album". The songs were sung by Lynch, with guest vocals on one track by Karen O of the Yeah Yeah Yeahs, and composed and performed by Lynch and Dean Hurley. All or most of the songs for Crazy Clown Time were put into art-music videos, Lynch directing the title song's video.

On September 29, 2011, Lynch released This Train with vocalist and long-time musical collaborator Chrysta Bell on the La Rose Noire label. The 11-song album was produced by Lynch and co-written primarily by Lynch and Chrysta Bell. It includes the song "Polish Poem" which is featured on the Inland Empire soundtrack. The musical partnership also yielded a 5- song EP entitled Somewhere in the Nowhere, released October 7, 2016, on Meta Hari Records.

Lynch's third studio album, The Big Dream, was released in 2013 and included the single "I'm Waiting Here", with Swedish singer-songwriter Lykke Li. The Big Dreams release was preceded by TBD716, an enigmatic 43-second video featured on Lynch's YouTube and Vine accounts.

For Record Store Day 2014, David Lynch released The Big Dream Remix EP which featured four songs from his album remixed by various artists. This included the track "Are You Sure" remixed by Bastille. The band Bastille have been known to take inspiration from David Lynch's work for their songs and music videos, the main one being their song "Laura Palmer" which is influenced by Lynch's television show Twin Peaks.

On November 2, 2018, a collaborative album by Lynch and Angelo Badalamenti, titled Thought Gang, was released on vinyl and on compact disc. The album was recorded around 1993 but was unreleased at the time. Two tracks from the album already appeared on the soundtrack from the 1992 movie 'Twin Peaks: Fire walk with me' and three other tracks were used for the 'Twin Peaks' TV series in 2017.

In May 2019, Lynch provided guest vocals on the track Fire is Coming by Flying Lotus. He also co-wrote the track that appears on Flying Lotus' album Flamagra. A video accompanying the song was released on April 17, 2019.

In May 2021, Lynch produced a new track by Scottish artist Donovan titled "I Am the Shaman". The song was released on 10 May, Donovan's 75th birthday. Lynch also directed the accompanying video.

Design
Lynch designed and constructed furniture for his 1997 film Lost Highway, notably the small table in the Madison house and the VCR case. In April 1997, he presented a furniture collection at the prestigious Milan Furniture Fair. "Design and music, art and architecture – they all belong together."

Working with designer Raphael Navot, architectural agency Enia and light designer Thierry Dreyfus, Lynch has conceived and designed a nightclub in Paris. "Silencio" opened in October 2011, and is a private members' club although is free to the public after midnight. Patrons have access to concerts, films and other performances by artists and guests. Inspired by the club of the same name in his 2001 film Mulholland Drive, the underground space consists of a series of rooms, each dedicated to a certain purpose or atmosphere. "Silencio is something dear to me. I wanted to create an intimate space where all the arts could come together. There won't be a Warhol-like guru, but it will be open to celebrated artists of all disciplines to come here to programme or create what they want."

Literature
In 2006, Lynch authored a short book describing his creative processes, stories from throughout his career, and the benefits he had realized through his practice of Transcendental Meditation called Catching the Big Fish: Meditation, Consciousness, and Creativity. He describes the metaphor behind the title in the introduction:

The book weaves a non-linear autobiography with descriptions of Lynch's cognitive experiences during Transcendental Meditation.

Working with Kristine McKenna, Lynch published a biography-memoir hybrid, Room to Dream, in June 2018.

Awards and nominations

In 2017, Lynch was awarded The Edward MacDowell Medal by The MacDowell Colony for outstanding contributions to American culture.

Personal life
Relationships
Lynch has had several long-term relationships. In January 1968, he married Peggy Reavey, with whom he had one child, Jennifer Lynch, born in 1968, who is a film director. They filed for divorce in 1974. In June 1977, Lynch married Mary Fisk, and the couple had one child, Austin Jack Lynch, born in 1982. They divorced in 1987. Lynch later developed a relationship with Mary Sweeney, with whom he had one son, Riley Sweeney Lynch, born in 1992. Sweeney also worked as Lynch's longtime film editor/producer and co-wrote and produced The Straight Story. The two married in May 2006, but filed for divorce that June. In 2009, Lynch married actress Emily Stofle, who appeared in his 2006 film Inland Empire as well as the 2017 revival of Twin Peaks. The couple have one child, Lula Boginia Lynch, born in 2012.

Political views and public positions
Lynch has said that he is "not a political person" and that he knows little about politics. In the 1990s, he expressed admiration for former U.S. president Ronald Reagan, saying, "I mostly liked that he carried a wind of old Hollywood, of a cowboy." Describing his political philosophy in 2006, he stated, "at that time, I thought of myself as a libertarian. I believed in next to zero government. And I still would lean toward no government and not so many rules, except for traffic lights and things like this. I really believe in traffic regulations." Lynch continued to state that "I'm a Democrat now. And I've always been a Democrat, really. But I don't like the Democrats a lot, either, because I'm a smoker, and I think a lot of the Democrats have come up with these rules for non-smoking." He endorsed the center-left Natural Law Party in the 2000 presidential election and later stated that he would vote for Democratic incumbent Barack Obama in the 2012 presidential election.

In 2009, Lynch signed a petition in support of director Roman Polanski after Polanski's arrest on his 1977 sexual abuse charges. Polanski had been detained while traveling to a film festival. The petition argued the arrest would undermine the tradition of film festivals as a place for works to be shown "freely and safely", and that arresting filmmakers traveling to neutral countries could open the door "for actions of which no-one can know the effects."

In the 2016 United States presidential election, he endorsed Bernie Sanders, whom he described as "for the people." He voted for Sanders in the 2016 Democratic Primary and for Libertarian candidate Gary Johnson in the general election. In a June 2018 interview with The Guardian, he stated that Donald Trump could go down as "one of the greatest presidents in history because he has disrupted the [country] so much. No one is able to counter this guy in an intelligent way." He added: "Our so-called leaders can't take the country forward, can't get anything done. Like children, they are. Trump has shown all this." The interviewer clarified that "while Trump may not be doing a good job himself, Lynch thinks, he is opening up a space where other outsiders might." At a rally later that month Trump read out sections from the interview claiming Lynch as a supporter. Lynch later clarified on Facebook that the quote was taken out of context, saying that Trump would "not have a chance to go down in history as a great president" if he continued on the course of "causing suffering and division", advising him to "treat all the people as you would like to be treated".

In one of his daily weather report videos, Lynch expressed support for Black Lives Matter protests. In another such video, Lynch condemned the Russian invasion of Ukraine and addressed Russian president Vladimir Putin directly, telling him there was "no room for this kind of absurdity anymore" and that Putin would reap what he had sown, lifetime after lifetime.

Transcendental Meditation

Lynch advocates Transcendental Meditation as a spiritual practice. He was initiated into Transcendental Meditation in July 1973, and has practiced the technique consistently since then. Lynch says he met Maharishi Mahesh Yogi, the founder of the TM movement, for the first time in 1975 at the Spiritual Regeneration Movement center in Los Angeles, California. He became close with the Maharishi during a month-long "Millionaire's Enlightenment Course" held in 2003, the fee for which was $1 million.

In July 2005, Lynch launched the David Lynch Foundation for Consciousness-Based Education and Peace, established to help finance scholarships for students in middle and high schools who are interested in learning Transcendental Meditation and to fund research on the technique and its effects on learning. Together with John Hagelin and Fred Travis, a brain researcher from Maharishi University of Management (MUM), Lynch promoted his vision on college campuses with a tour that began in September 2005. Lynch is on MUM's board of trustees and has hosted an annual "David Lynch Weekend for World Peace and Meditation" there since 2005.

Lynch was working for the building and establishment of seven buildings in which 8,000 salaried people would practice advanced meditation techniques, "pumping peace for the world". He estimates the cost at US$7 billion. As of December 2005, he had spent $400,000 of his money and raised $1 million in donations. In December 2006, The New York Times reported that he continued to have that goal. Lynch's book Catching the Big Fish (Tarcher/Penguin 2006) discusses Transcendental Meditation's effect on his creative process. Lynch attended the funeral of the Maharishi in India in 2008. He told a reporter, "In life, he revolutionized the lives of millions of people. ... In 20, 50, 500 years there will be millions of people who will know and understand what the Maharishi has done." In 2009, Lynch went to India to film interviews with people who knew the Maharishi as part of a biographical documentary.

In 2009, Lynch organized a benefit concert at Radio City Music Hall for the David Lynch Foundation. On April 4, 2009, the "Change Begins Within" concert featured Paul McCartney, Ringo Starr, Donovan, Sheryl Crow, Eddie Vedder, Moby, Bettye LaVette, Ben Harper, and Mike Love of the Beach Boys. David Wants to Fly, released in May 2010, is a documentary by German filmmaker David Sieveking "that follows the path of his professional idol, David Lynch, into the world of Transcendental Meditation (TM)". At the end of the film, Sieveking becomes disillusioned with Lynch.

An independent project starring Lynch called Beyond The Noise: My Transcendental Meditation Journey, directed by film student Dana Farley, who has severe dyslexia and attention deficit disorder, was shown at film festivals in 2011, including the Marbella Film Festival. Filmmaker Kevin Sean Michaels is one of the producers. In 2013, Lynch wrote: "Transcendental Meditation leads to a beautiful, peaceful revolution. A change from suffering and negativity to happiness and a life more and more free of any problems."

In a 2019 interview of Lynch by British artist Alexander de Cadenet, Lynch said of TM, "Here's an experience that utilizes the full brain. That's what it's for. It's for enlightenment, for higher states of consciousness, culminating in the highest state of unity consciousness." In April 2022, Lynch announced a $500 million transcendental meditation world peace initiative to fund transcendental meditation for 30,000 college students.

Website
Lynch designed his personal website, a site exclusive to paying members, where he posts short videos and his absurdist series Dumbland, plus interviews and other items. The site also featured a daily weather report, where Lynch gives a brief description of the weather in Los Angeles, where he resides. He continues to broadcast this weather report (usually no longer than 30 seconds) on his personal YouTube channel, DAVID LYNCH THEATER, along with "TODAY'S NUMBER", where he draws a random number, between one and ten, out of a bingo cage. Lynch also created a short film, "Rabbits", for his website. Absurd ringtone ("I like to kill deer") from the website was a common sound bite on The Howard Stern Show in early 2006.

Lynch is a coffee drinker and has his own line of special organic blends available for purchase on his website and at Whole Foods. Called "David Lynch Signature Cup", the coffee has been advertised via flyers included with several recent Lynch-related DVD releases, including Inland Empire and the Gold Box edition of Twin Peaks. The brand's tagline is "It's all in the beans ... and I'm just full of beans." This is also a line said by Justin Theroux's character in Inland Empire.

Archive
The moving image collection of David Lynch is held at the Academy Film Archive, which has preserved two of his student films.

 Solo exhibitions 

Discography

Studio albumsBlueBOB (2001)Crazy Clown Time (2011)The Big Dream (2013)

Collaborative albumsLux Vivens (with Jocelyn Montgomery) (1998)The Air Is On Fire (with Dean Hurley) (2007)Polish Night Music (with Marek Zebrowski) (2007)This Train (with Chrysta Bell) (2011)Somewhere in the Nowhere (with Chrysta Bell) (2016)Thought Gang (with Angelo Badalamenti) (recorded 1992/93) (2018)

See also
 David Lynch's unrealized projects

References

Bibliography
 Lynch, David and McKenna, Kristine (2018). Room to Dream. Random House. 

Further reading

 David Lynch: The Art of the Real, the website of a 2012 Berlin conference on the artistic work of David Lynch with all lectures in text form.
 David Lynch: The Unified Field by Robert Cozzolino with Alethea Rockwell (Pennsylvania Academy of the Fine Arts, Philadelphia and the University of California Press, 2014 ).
 The Passion of David Lynch: Wild at Heart in Hollywood by Martha Nochimson (University of Texas Press, 1997).
 The Complete Lynch by David Hughes (Virgin Virgin, 2002).
 Weirdsville U.S.A.: The Obsessive Universe of David Lynch by Paul A. Woods (Plexus Publishing. UK, Reprint edition, 2000).
 David Lynch (Twayne's Filmmakers Series) by Kenneth C. Kaleta (Twayne Publishers, 1992).
 Pervert in the Pulpit: Morality in the Works of David Lynch by Jeff Johnson (McFarland & Company, 2004).
 Snowmen by David Lynch (Foundation Cartier pour l'art contemporain, Paris, 2008).
 David Lynch: Beautiful Dark by Greg Olson (Scarecrow Press, 2008).
 The Film Paintings of David Lynch: Challenging Film Theory by Allister Mactaggart (Intellect, 2010).
 Interpretazione tra mondi. Il pensiero figurale di David Lynch by Pierluigi Basso Fossali (Edizioni ETS, Pisa, 2008, 9788846716712).
 David Lynch ed. by Paolo Bertetto (Marsilio, Venezia, 2008, 9788831793933).
 David Lynch – Un cinéma du maléfique, by Enrique Seknadje, Editions Camion Noir, 2010. .
 David Lynch in Theory , a collection of essays edited by Francois-Xavier Gleyzon (Charles University Press, 2010) .
 David Lynch, 2nd Edition'' by Michel Chion (BFI Publishing, 2006).
 Mulholland Drive: An Intertextual Reading  by Ebrahim Barzegar (CINEJ Cinema Journal, 2014)
 Labyrinths and Illusions in David Lynch's Mulholland Drive and Inland Empire  by Ebrahim Barzegar (CINEJ Cinema Journal, 2016)

External links

 
 Official YouTube Channel
 
 
 David Lynch at Moviefone
 
 Bibliography of books and articles about Lynch via UC Berkeley Media Resources Center

 
1946 births
Living people
20th-century American male musicians
20th-century American male writers
20th-century American screenwriters
21st-century American male musicians
21st-century American male writers
21st-century American screenwriters
Academy Honorary Award recipients
AFI Conservatory alumni
American comic strip cartoonists
American experimental filmmakers
American experimental musicians
American film producers
American furniture designers
American libertarians
American lyricists
American male painters
American male screenwriters
American male television actors
American male voice actors
American music video directors
American people of Finnish descent
American philanthropists
American rock musicians
American surrealist artists
American television directors
Animators from Montana
Artists from Missoula, Montana
California Democrats
Cannes Film Festival Award for Best Director winners
César Award winners
Directors of Palme d'Or winners
European Film Awards winners (people)
Film directors from Los Angeles
Film directors from Montana
George Washington University Corcoran School alumni
Horror film directors
Male actors from California
Male actors from Los Angeles
Male actors from Montana
Male actors from Philadelphia
Musicians from Los Angeles
Musicians from Missoula, Montana
Musicians from Philadelphia
Officiers of the Légion d'honneur
Pennsylvania Academy of the Fine Arts alumni
People from Missoula, Montana
Postmodernist filmmakers
Sacred Bones Records artists
School of the Museum of Fine Arts at Tufts alumni
Screenwriters from California
Screenwriters from Montana
Surrealist filmmakers
Television producers from California
Television producers from Pennsylvania
Transcendental Meditation exponents
Writers from Los Angeles
Writers from Missoula, Montana
Writers from Philadelphia